The Ambiguously Gay Duo is an American animated comedy sketch that debuted on The Dana Carvey Show before moving to its permanent home on Saturday Night Live. It is created and produced by Robert Smigel and J. J. Sedelmaier as part of the Saturday TV Funhouse series of sketches.  It follows the adventures of Ace and Gary, voiced by Stephen Colbert and Steve Carell, respectively, two superheroes whose sexual orientation is a matter of dispute, and a cavalcade of characters preoccupied with the question.

Background
The Ambiguously Gay Duo is a parody of the stereotypical comic book superhero duo done in the style of Saturday morning cartoons like Super Friends. The characters are clad in matching pastel turquoise tights, dark blue domino masks, and bright yellow coordinated gauntlets, boots and trunks. The shorts were intended to satirize suggestions that early Batman comics implied a homosexual relationship between the eponymous title character and his field partner and protégé Robin, a charge most infamously leveled by Fredric Wertham in his 1954 book, Seduction of the Innocent, the research methodology for which was later discredited.

The typical episode usually begins with the duo's arch-nemesis Bighead, a criminal mastermind with an abnormally large cranium. Bighead is usually briefing his henchmen on a plot for some grandiose plan for world domination, interrupted by a debate as to whether or not Ace and Gary (The Ambiguously Gay Duo) are gay. Once the crime is in process, the police commissioner calls on the superheroes to save the day, often engaging in similar debates with the chief of police.

Ace and Gary set out to foil the evil plan, but not before calling attention to themselves with outrageous antics and innuendo, and behaving in ways perceived by other characters to be stereotypically homosexual, as in this conversation from the first episode:

Ace [patting Gary on the buttocks]: Good job, friend-of-friends!
Villains/Bystanders [gasps, and ghastly stares]
Ace: What's everybody looking at?
Villains/Bystanders in unison: NOTHING!

And in another incident of a similar fashion, Ace would then ask:

Ace: Now what are you looking at?
Villains/Bystanders in unison: NOTHING!

Similar gags appear in almost every episode.

Episodes not following this general formula have featured Ace and Gary answering fan mail or offering child safety tips. One such episode entails Ace and Gary giving children a ride home in their Duocar and offering home decorating tips, all while blithely making various suggestive gestures and comments.

In June 2020, Robert Smigel told The Daily Beast that the engine of the show was an "obsession with sexuality" and that he thought that it was funny because the homophobes and everyone are obsessed with finding out whether the superheroes are gay or not, calling it "sport and titillation." He added that the point of the cartoon was that it doesn't matter whether the superheroes have sex or not and said that since there has been "an incredible amount of progress" since the series premiered, he would not write the cartoon today.

Characters

The Ambiguously Gay Duo
 Ace (voiced by Stephen Colbert) – Ace is the leader of the duo. He is mentor to Gary, whom he refers to as "friend of friends." He has a wide array of superhuman powers, including most (if not all) of Gary's powers.
 Gary (voiced by Steve Carell) – Gary is Ace's "sidekick" and protégé, and the younger of the duo. Gary is less experienced, and has fewer superhuman powers than Ace. His powers include superhuman strength, breath, stamina, flexibility, flight (though Ace and Gary use the phallic-shaped Duocar more often than they fly), and "laser vision."

Supporting characters
 Announcer (voiced by Bill Chott) – The Announcer is a disembodied voice who announces the title of each episode.
 The Police Commissioner (voiced by Steve Carell) – The Police Commissioner is the duo's primary contact, and when trouble arises, he makes the call to their hangout. His calls tend to interrupt a workout of some kind, with one or the other of the duo shirtless.
 The Chief of Police (voiced by Bill Chott) – The Chief of Police is seen with the commissioner, apparently waiting to find evidence in support of his belief that Ace and Gary are gay.
 Kijoro – Kijoro is the duo's mentor whose spirit resides in the "Fortress of Privacy" and offers advice from time to time when Ace and Gary seek counsel.
 Piño – The butler of Ace and Gary.

Villains
 Bighead (voiced by Robert Smigel) – Bighead is a mad scientist with a very large, bald head, and is usually the brains behind most of the evil schemes. Second only to his primary vocation of mad scientist is his obsession with outing the superheroes as gay, which tends to annoy his co-conspirators because they do not care about the duo's sexuality and only want to defeat them in order to rule the world. He is constantly criticized for the amount of energy he invests in this pursuit.
 Dr. Brainio (voiced by Stephen Colbert) – Dr. Brainio is another mad scientist with a brain suspended above his head and attached by a trio of cables and tubing that go into his head. He occasionally partners with Bighead, but is quite a bit more undecided about Ace and Gary.
 Orbitrox – Orbitrox is a small, green, free-floating droid who sides with Bighead on the question of Ace's and Gary's sexual orientation. His sounds are translated by subtitles. Orbitrox has proffered evidence of them having visited gay bars, but he emphatically denies visiting them himself, snapping in subtitled form "Back off, dickweed, it's research!"
 Beetles of Zolaro (voiced by Robert Smigel) – A race of alien beetles from the planet Zolaro.
 Queen Serena (voiced by Ana Gasteyer) – An intergalactic queen from the planetoid Garassas that is an ally of Bighead.
 Flame Eye (voiced by Bill Hader) – A henchman of Bighead and Dr. Brainio with a fiery right eye that can shoot fire from it.
 Lizardo (voiced by Bill Hader in the first appearance, Robert Smigel in the second appearance) – A lizard man henchman of Bighead and Dr. Brainio.
 Half-Scary (voiced by Robert Smigel) – A Two-Face-like henchman of Bighead and Dr. Brainio.
 Flatside (voiced by Bill Hader impersonating Edward G. Robinson) – A henchman of Bighead and Dr. Brainio whose head is flat on one side.

Episodes
All episodes debuted on Saturday Night Live except where noted.

Other appearances
 January 12, 2002: (Josh Hartnett/Pink), The Ambiguously Gay Duo makes a surprise appearance in The X-Presidents episode "The Hunt for Osama." The Ambiguously Gay Duo show up in their Duocar where they help the X-Presidents capture Osama bin Laden.
 April 29, 2006: The Ambiguously Gay Duo co-hosted Saturday Night Live: The Best of TV Funhouse. The hosting duties included the opening monologue performed by Ace and Gary, plus new animated/live-action material during the pre-commercial and post-commercial bumpers. It was revealed during these bumper segments that they seem to have an undying obsession with former cast member Jimmy Fallon. The show ended with the duo taking cast members Jason Sudeikis and Andy Samberg to their secret headquarters — both naked — in the Duocar, with announcer Don Pardo begging to be taken with them and a spurned Jimmy Fallon looking on from his apartment window with tears in his eyes.

In May 2011, a live-action skit based on the series appeared in a Saturday Night Live episode, with Jon Hamm playing Ace and Jimmy Fallon playing Gary. Daniel Villarreal criticized the skit as biphobic and questioned whether two non-gay actors portraying the parts was progressive or problematic.

In 2015, Bif Bang Pow Toys produced and released a new 8" retro action-figure line of Ace and Gary titled the Ambiguously Gay Duo 8" retro action figure series. They were both individually packaged on a card but sold together in a set at the Entertainment Earth Catalog and website and at other toy and comic book stores as well. That same year, Bif Bang Pow Toys produced the Ambiguously Gay Duo Tin Tote (Lunchbox) action figure set of three 5" action-figures of Ace, Gary, and Bighead.

Reception
Matt Goldberg of Collider said that the series was a "one-note joke" but that it worked well as a "great parody of superhero cartoon shows."

Adam Polaski of The Good Men Project praised the animation and the live-action sketch in 2011 as a satire that spoofs "the inherently homoerotic nature of superheroes...[and the] stereotype that gay men are obsessed with sex."

Francis Rizzo III of DVD Talk, while calling the cartoons "silly" and "formulaic", praised the voice work from Colbert and Carrell, along with how the series served as a "visual parody of old cartoons," especially the homoerotic theories about Batman and Robin.

TV Line writers said in 2018 that if the crime fighters had reappeared that year, viewers might have found out if the two protagonists had changed, if they'd be "out and proud, rebranded as the Unambiguously Gay Duo," and if they'd fight to mend "the social divisions in our country."

See also
 List of Saturday TV Funhouse segments

References

External links

Comedy television characters
Fictional gay males
Male characters in animated series
Gay-related television shows
LGBT superheroes
Saturday Night Live sketches
Saturday Night Live in the 1990s
American adult animated comedy television series
American adult animated superhero television series
Television characters introduced in 1996
Parody superheroes
Fictional LGBT characters in television
LGBT characters in animation